The 1995 San Antonio Texans season was the third season for the franchise in Canadian Football League and their first in San Antonio, Texas after their relocation from Sacramento, California. They earned a 12–6 record and finished 2nd in the South Division, allowing the team to advance to playoffs where they lost the South Final to the Baltimore Stallions. The Texans would cease operations following the end of their season.

Pre-season

At Memphis W 35–14
Vs. Shreveport W 34–14

Regular season

Season standings

Schedule

At Shreveport W 47–24 (15,133)
At Baltimore L 24–50 (31,016)
Vs. Baltimore L 23–28 (18,112)
Vs. Edmonton W 32–27 (12,856)
At Winnipeg L 17–20 (20,961)
At Saskatchewan W 36–15 (22,215)
Vs. Memphis W 24–9 (15,557)
Vs. Calgary L 32–38 (22,043)
At Hamilton L 31–35 (20,520)
At Memphis W 26–6 (16,223)
Vs. Toronto W 47–28 (16,028)
At Toronto W 42–21 (14,593)
Vs. Hamilton W 7–45 (14,614)
At Ottawa W 49–14 (19,957)
At Birmingham L 28–38 (6,859)
Vs. Ottawa W 43–30 (10,027)
Vs. Shreveport W 35–26 (14,437)
Vs. Birmingham W 48–42 (19,025)

Playoffs

Vs. Birmingham W 51–9
At Baltimore L 11–21 (South Conference Championship)

References

San Antonio Texans
Ham
1995 in American sports
1995 in sports in Texas